SS Torrey Canyon was an LR2 Suezmax class oil tanker with a cargo capacity of  of crude oil. She ran aground off the western coast of Cornwall, United Kingdom, on 18 March 1967, causing an environmental disaster. At that time she was the largest vessel ever to be wrecked.

Design and history
However, the ship was later enlarged by Sasebo Heavy Industries in Japan to  capacity.

At the time of the shipwreck she was owned by Barracuda Tanker Corporation, a subsidiary of the Union Oil Company of California, and registered in Liberia but chartered to BP.

Accident and oil spill

On 19 February 1967, Torrey Canyon left the Kuwait National Petroleum Company refinery, at Mina, Kuwait (later Al Ahmadi) on her final voyage with a full cargo of crude oil. The ship reached the Canary Islands on 14 March. From there the planned route was to Milford Haven in Wales.

Torrey Canyon struck Pollard's Rock on Seven Stones reef, between the Cornish mainland and the Isles of Scilly, on 18 March. It became grounded and, several days later, began to break up.

In an effort to reduce the size of the oil spill, the British government decided to set the wreck on fire, by means of air strikes from the Fleet Air Arm (FAA) and Royal Air Force (RAF). On 28 March 1967, FAA Blackburn Buccaneers from RNAS Lossiemouth dropped 1,000-pound bombs on the ship. Afterwards RAF Hawker Hunter from RAF Chivenor dropped cans of jet fuel (kerosene), to fuel the blaze. However, the fire was put out by high tides, and further strikes were needed to re-ignite the oil, by FAA de Havilland Sea Vixens from RNAS Yeovilton and Buccaneers from the RNAS Brawdy, as well as Hunters of No 1(F) Squadron RAF from RAF West Raynham with napalm. Bombing continued into the next day, until Torrey Canyon finally sank.

Attempts to contain the oil using foam-filled containment booms were largely unsuccessful, due to the booms' fragility in high seas.

Guernsey
When the oil reached Guernsey seven days after the grounding, authorities scooped up the oil into sewage tankers and siphoned it off into a disused quarry in the northeast of the island. Some time later, micro-organisms were introduced to see if they could break the oil down into carbon dioxide and water. This was a limited success, so in 2010, a bio-remediation process was initiated to speed up the process.

Aftermath
An inquiry in Liberia, where the ship was registered, found Shipmaster Pastrengo Rugiati was to blame, because he took a shortcut to save time to get to Milford Haven. Additionally a design fault meant that the helmsman was unaware that the steering selector switch had been accidentally left on autopilot and hence was unable to carry out a timely turn to go through the shipping channel.

In popular culture
Serge Gainsbourg composed and recorded the song "Torrey Canyon" about the incident.
The UK series Heartbeat ran an episode in which one of the characters lost his fortune by becoming a "name" (underwriter) for the Torrey Canyon.
The podcast Cautionary Tales aired an episode about the Torrey Canyon, and what we can learn from the accident.

References

Cornish shipwrecks
Oil tankers
Maritime incidents in 1967
Shipwrecks of the Isles of Scilly
Wreck diving sites in England
Ships of BP Shipping
1958 ships
Ships sunk by British aircraft
Union Oil Company of California
1967 in England
Cargo ships of Liberia